Dobinea is a small genus of plants in the subfamily Anacardioideae of the cashew and sumac family Anacardiaceae. The species are dioecious and grow as shrubs or perennial herbs. They grow naturally in the East Himalaya region and China.

Species
The Plant List and Flora of China recognise 2 accepted species:
 Dobinea delavayi 
 Dobinea vulgaris

References

Anacardiaceae
Anacardiaceae genera
Dioecious plants